Edward Bridgeman was Sheriff of Exeter, Devon, in 1563. He is the ancestor of the Bridgeman baronets, the Earls of Bradford and the Viscounts Bridgeman. He had at least two sons, Thomas and Michael. His daughter Anastryce Bridgeman (c. 1540–1599) became the second wife of John Hooker (c. 1527–1601) (alias John Vowell) of Exeter, historian, writer, solicitor, antiquary, and civic administrator. His grandson John Bridgeman became Bishop of Chester in 1619.

References

16th-century births
High Sheriffs of Devon
Year of death unknown
16th-century English people
Edward